The Music Men (also styled as The Musicmen) are an Australian comedy act, originally consisting of ten English soccer players, visiting Australia. They first appeared on Australian television performing "I am the Music Man" on the Red Faces segment of Hey Hey It's Saturday in 1988.

In 1993 advertising agency Saatchi & Saatchi approached them to star in an advertisement for Toohey's Gold.

In 1993, Michael Gudinski from Mushroom Records signed the group and they released a single "I Am a Football Fan" in September 1993. Their debut album, What Can You Play? was released in November 1993 and peaked at number 74 on the ARIA charts.

In September 1995, the group released "Ablett's in the Air", which peaked at number 41 on the ARIA charts.

In October 2021, they released the single "Those Were the Days".

Discography

Albums

Singles

References

Musical groups established in 1988
1988 establishments in Australia